The National Olympic Committee of Turkmenistan (IOC code: TKM) is the National Olympic Committee representing Turkmenistan. It is led by 
the President of Turkmenistan, Serdar Berdimuhamedow.

References

External links 
National Olympic Committee of Turkmenistan

Turkmenistan
Olympic
Turkmenistan at the Olympics
1990 establishments in Turkmenistan
Sports organizations established in 1990